"Hans My Hedgehog" is a German fairy tale collected by the Brothers Grimm (KHM 108). The tale was translated as Jack My Hedgehog by Andrew Lang and published in The Green Fairy Book. It is of Aarne-Thompson type 441.

The tale follows the events in the life of a diminutive half-hedgehog, half-human being named Hans, who eventually sheds his animal skin and turns wholly human after winning a princess.

Origin 
The tale was first published by the Brothers Grimm in Kinder- und Hausmärchen, vol. 2, (1815) as tale no. 22. From the second edition onward, it was given the no. 108. Their source was the German storyteller Dorothea Viehmann (1755–1815).

Synopsis
A wealthy but childless farmer wishes he had a child, even a hedgehog. He comes home to find that his wife has given birth to a baby boy that is a hedgehog from the waist up. They then name him "Hans My Hedgehog".

After eight years, Hans leaves his family riding a shod cockerel to seek his fortune. He goes off into the woods and sits in a tree and plays his bagpipe and watches the bigs and donkeys hook up for a year. A few years later, a lost king stumbles upon Hans after hearing him play beautifully on the bagpipes. Hans makes a deal with the king: he will show him the way home if the king promises to sign over whatever first comes to meet him upon his return. However, the king thinks Hans is illiterate, and decides to trick him by writing an order that Hans should receive nothing. When they arrive at the kingdom, the king's daughter runs to greet him. The king tells her about the deal Hans has tried to make and how he has tricked him. Unconcerned by the betrayal, Hans continues to tend to his animals in the forest.

A second lost king stumbles upon Hans and agrees to his deal. Upon his return, the second king's only daughter rushes out to greet him, and in doing so becomes the property of Hans. For the sake of her father, the princess happily agrees to Hans' deal.

In time, Hans My Hedgehog goes to claim his promises. The first king attempts to withhold his daughter, but Hans forces him to give her up. Hans then makes her take off her clothes, pierces her with his prickles until she is bloody all over, and sends her back to the kingdom in disgrace. The second king agrees to the marriage; the princess holds herself bound by her promise and Hans My Hedgehog marries her. On their wedding night, he tells the king to build a fire and to post guards at his door. Hans removes his hedgehog skin and instructs the guards to throw the skin in the fire and watch it until it is completely consumed. Hans appears black, as if he has been burned. After physicians clean him he is shown to be a handsome young gentleman. After several years Hans returns home to collect his father and they live together in the kingdom.

Characters

Characters list 
 Hans – Main character, with a tiny human's lower body but quilled head and torso of a hedgehog.
 Farmer (Hans' father) – Wishes for a son "even if it's a hedgehog"
 Farmer's wife (Hans' mother)
 First King – Betrays Hans and breaks his promise reward him with his daughter's hand in marriage.
 Second King – Fulfills his promise and becomes Hans's father in-law.
 First Princess – Refuses to marry Hans and is punished by being pricked by Hans' quills until she bleeds. 
 Second Princess – Honors her father's wishes and agrees to marry Hans.

Analysis

Tale type 
The tale is similar to other ATU 441 tales such as Straparola's literary fairy tale Il re Porco ("King Pig") and Madame d'Aulnoy's Prince Marcassin.

The animal husband 
Polish philologist Mark Lidzbarski noted that the pig prince usually appears in Romance language tales, while the hedgehog as the animal husband occurs in Germanic and Slavic tales. Also, according to Swedish folklorist , in type ATU 441 the animal husband may be a hedgehog, a wild boar or a porcupine.  The Grimms' notes state that in these fairy tales, "Hedgehog, porcupine, and pig are here synonymous, like Porc and Porcaril".

Variants 
According to Swedish folklorist  and narrative researcher , tale type ATU 441 is reported in Germany, Baltic Countries, Hungary and among West Slavic and South Slavic peoples (although Liungman mentioned the existence of variants in Sweden, Greece, and Italy).

Another version is "Der Lustige Zaunigel" ("The Merry Hedgehog"; actually "Porcupine") collected by Heinrich Pröhle and published in 1854.

The Scottish version "The Hedgehurst" recited by Traveller storyteller Duncan Williamson has also been published in book collection.

Hungary 
The Hungarian Folktale Catalogue (MNK) registers 8 variants in Hungary indexed as type AaTh 441, A sündisznó ("The Hedgehog"), three of them combined with other types.

In a Hungarian variant translated by Jeremiah Curtin (Hungarian: A sündisznó; English: "The Hedgehog, the Merchant, the King and the Poor Man"), the tale begins with a merchant promising a hedgehog one of his daughters, after the animal helped him escape a dense forest. Only the eldest agrees to be the hedgehog's wife, which prompts him to reveal his true form as a golden-haired, golden-mouthed and golden-toothed prince. The tale continues as tale type ATU 707, "The Three Golden Children" (The Dancing Water, the Singing Apple, and the Speaking Bird).

Slavic 
In a South Slavic tale published by Slavicist Friedrich Salomon Krauss with the title Prinz Igel ("Prince Hedgehog"), a childless empress and emperor wish for a child even if he is the size of a hedgehog, so God grants them their wish. Seven years later, the little animal marries a human girl, who is advised to sprinkle the hedgehog with holy water, prickle her fingers on three of his quills and let her blood fall on his body. Following this advice, the girl disenchants the hedgehog into a normal youth. The tale was translated as Prince Hedgehog and published in The Russian grandmother's wonder tales.

Czech writer  collected a Czech tale (sourced from Bohemia) with the title Ježek ženichem ("The Hedgehog as Bridegroom"), which  translated as Der Igel as Bräutigam ("The Hedgehog as Bridegroom"). In this tale, a peasant lives with his wife and does not have a child, until one night she expresses her wish for a hedgehog for a son. Her husband warns her about her words, to no avail: the next morning, a little hedgehog appears from behind the stove and becomes their son, despite the man's complaints. Some time later, the hedgehog asks his father for a whip and a shepherd's staff so he can graze the sheep. One day, a prince becomes lost in the woods, and the hedgehog offers to guide him out of the woods, if the prince agrees to give one of his daughters as bride for the animal. To seal the deal, they signs a written document. Later, the hedgehog saddles a rooster and goes to the prince's castle to fulfill the latter's part of the deal. The prince asks which of his daughters shall marry the hedgehog: the elder two refuse, but the youngest agrees to be his bride. They marry. On the wedding night, the prince's daughter cries, and the hedgehog asks the girl to take a knife and cut open his body. The girl obeys and cuts open the hedgehog's body, revealing a handsome youth underneath. The next morning, the human hedgehog takes his wife for breakfast with the prince and his family and introduces himself as the hedgehog, explaining his mother's hasty wish was the cause of his animal form. The prince's elder daughters kill themselves out of envy: one throws herself from a window and the other jumps into a well. As for the girl, she lives happily ever after with her human husband.

In a Croatian tale translated by August Leskien with the title Der Igelbräutigam ("The Hedgehog Bridegroom"), a woman gives birth to a hedgehog who her husband expels from home. The hedgehog spends his days in the woods herding and fattening his father's pigs. When he returns home, he asks his parents to find him a human bride. They marry, and he takes off his skin at night. The tale, however, ends abruptly with the burning of his hedgehog's skin, and him complaining to his wife. In his notes to the tale, Leskien supposed that story could have led into another sequence, but the second part was apparently missing.

Poland 
Philologist and folklorist Julian Krzyżanowski, establisher of the Polish Folktale Catalogue according to the international index, classified tales about the hedgehog husband as Polish type T 441, Królewicz-jeż ("Prince-Hedgehog").

Slovenia 
In a Slovenian tale, The Little Hedgehog (Ježek), or in the Slovenian original,  ("Little Hedgehog Janček"), little Jancek is accidentally cursed by his mother, turns into a hedgehog and flees to the woods. Years later, when a count becomes lost in the forest, the little hedgehog helps the nobleman in return for the hand of one of his daughters in marriage.

In a Slovenian-language tale from Varaždin with the title Sin jež ("Hedgehog Son"), a childless couple pray to God to have a son, even if he is the size of a hedgehog, so God grants them one. Despite some fright at first, their hedgehog son grows up and asks his father to her his pigs in the forest. His father agrees to let him work with the pigs so he can stay away from them. The hedgehog son grazes the pigs in the woods when he sees that the king got lost and offers to help him. They make a deal and the hedgehog guides him out of the woods. Some time later, when his pig herd is large enough, the hedgehog goes to the king's castle and demands one of his daughters as part of their deal. the king asks his three daughters which will go with the hedgehog: the eldest would rather be stabbed, the middle one would rather jump in a well, but the youngest agrees to marry him, so they marry. One day, the princess stabs the hegdehog husband, and out of the skin comes out a handsome youth, to her delight and her sisters' resignation. The now human hedgehog son goes back to his parents to introduce his wife, and shows them the loose animal skin as proof of his claims.

In a Slovenian tale collected from Martinj Vrh with the title  ("Hedgehog Son"), a woman has a hedgehog son. He finds work with a local farmer and takes the pigs to graze in the forest and meets a man who lost his way. The hedgehog guides him out of the forest. The man loses his way again in the next year and in the year after. On the third time, however, the hedgehog makes a deal with the man: he will guide him out of the woods, but asks for one of the man's daughters as his bride. The hedgehog comes to the man's house on a rooster and demands his bride. The man asks his daughters which will go with the little animal: the eldest says she would rather cut her own throat, the middle one that she rather throw herself in a well, but the youngest agrees to marry him. The hedgehog and his bride walk to church, but the little animal asks her to go ahead of him, while he passes by the graveyard. When he comes out on the other side, the hedgehog has turned into a handsome youth, to the girl's sisters' despair: one cuts her throat and the other jumps into a well. The now human hedgehog and the girl marry.

Baltic Region

Estonia
In the Estonian Catalogue, the type is known as ATU 441, Siil pojaks ("The Hedgehog as Son"): a childless couple longs for a son and wishes for one that may even look like a hedgehog, so their wish is granted. The hedgehog grows up, works as a herd and tries to woo a princess. The king is then forced to give one of his daughters in marriage: only the youngest princess agrees, and she disenchants the hedgehog with three sticks.

In an Estonian tale translated into German as Wer will den Igel heiraten? ("Who shall marry the Hedgehog?"), a rich, but childless couple longs to have a son, even if he is a hegdehog, so one is born to them. After he grows up, he overhears his father saying that he can herd the cows, so he climbs on an ox's horns and herds the cows. The next time, he overhears his mother saying that, if he wasn't an animal, he could find a bride, so the hedgehog rides a rooster and goes to a man's house to court his daughters. The man asks his three daughters which shall marry the little animal: the elder two refuse, but the youngest agrees. On the wedding day, before the hedgehog and the girl arrive at church, the hedgehog asks her to find three sticks in a bush and hit him with them. The girl follows his orders and turns him to human shape, while the quills on the hedgehog's skin turn to gold coins.

Lithuania 
Lithuanian folklorist , in his analysis of Lithuanian folktales (published in 1936), listed 19 variants of type 441, Ežys - karaliaus žentas ("Hedgehog as King's Son-in-Law"). In a later revision of the catalogue, professor  renames it as type AT 441, Ežiukas, with 67 variants registered.

In a Lithuanian variant collected by linguist August Leskien and Karl Brugman, Vom Igel, der die Königstochter zur Frau bekam ("About the Hedgehog who took the King's Daughter for Wife"), a poor man adopts a hedgehog from the forest. The animal decides to fatten its father's pig in order to give birth to more piglets. The usual story occurs, but the narrative does not mention that the hedgehog becomes human. They also noted that this Lithuanian tale lacked the usual beginning of the mother's hasty wish and the ending with the prince's disenchantment.

Latvia 
According to the Latvian Folktale Catalogue, tale type ATU 441 is quite well known in Latvia, indexed as type 441, Ezītis-dēls ("The Hedgehog as Son"): a couple adopts a hedgehog as their son, and he works as a shepherd; later, he marries a princess, who takes his hedgehog skin and burns it.

In a Latvian tale translated into German as Das Igelpelzchen and into English as The Porcupine's Little Quill Coat, a poor couple prays to have a son, even if he is a little hedgehog. Suddenly, a hedgehog appears to them and declares to be their son. Years later, the little hedgehog offers to take care of their pigs. Three years pass, and the little hedgehog becomes a fine swineherd. One day, the ruler of the country loses his way in the forest and the little animal offers his help, in exchange for the ruler's youngest daughter in marriage. The ruler refuses and keeps losing his way in the woods, until he relents and accepts the hedgehog's proposal. The ruler's youngest daughter marries the hedgehog and takes him to the bridal chambers. The animal takes off the animal skin. The girl takes the animal skin and burns it. However, her husband (now a man) has a fever and a pained state, but endures it and becomes a man for good.

Analysis

Deformed dwarf

The Hans the Hedgehog character is a half-hedgehog, of clearly tiny stature. In the tale he rides a cock like a horse, and the two together is mistaken for some "little animal". Hans is treated as a "monster" in his folktale world, and thus distinguished from Thumbling or Tom Thumb who are merely diminutive humans. Unlike the other Grimms' tale characters who are portrayed as a fully animal form, Hans is the only half-animal half-human hybrid, thus increasing his overall outlandishness.

The researcher Ann Schmiesing engages in a disability studies analysis of the tale and its protagonist. According to her, the Grimms implicitly suggest Hans's outward appearance as symbolic of "a disease or impairment that stunted physical or cognitive growth", and thus Hans's condition is to be associated with disability as well as deformity. Hans therefore qualifies as being classed as the "cripple", or rather the "super cripple (supercrip)" hero figure. The fairy tale "cripple" is stereotypically ostracized and shunned by society, but even after he turns "supercripple", i.e., demonstrates "extraordinary abilities" and "overachievement", this does not vindicate him in the eyes of other folk in the story, but rather only exacerbates his "enfreakment", according to Schmiesing. To the readership, however, the able underdog is a figure that "defies pity".

In this analysis,  His level of "freakiness" is also heightened after he requests bagpipes from his father who is going to the market, as does the rooster that he rides.

Animal skin 
"Grimm's tale, "Hans, My Hedgehog," exhibits motif D721.3 "Disenchantment by destroying skin (covering)".

This motif is found in other Grimm's fairy tales and myths as a symbol of psychological metamorphosis. Hans was born half-hedgehog and he cannot break the spell until he is able to burn his prickly hedgehog skin.

This same motif of the burning of false or alternative skins in the attempt to create a single whole can also be found in the Grimm's tale of "The Donkey" (Das Eselein). In these cases, the groom upon marriage "literally undress from the donkey skin or quills.. casting their skins aside like old garments", according to researcher Carole Scott, who thus counts the animal skin as a sort of "magical dress". By shedding the skin/dress, Hans has assumed a new identity.

Other adaptations

Books 
 Hans my Hedgehog was readapted by the German children's book-writer Janosch, in Janosch erzählt Grimms Märchen 1972, translated as Not Quite as Grimm. Janosch's fairy-tale book distinguishes itself from all previous fairy-tale books. It lives from the lively language stamped by the oral tradition. It demands reading aloud: it is acoustic and at the same time porous enough so that the child can make something out of the telling by himself or herself. In short, the anachronistic language of the children's book that has been polished for children is missing. The form of the fairy-tale material that the Brothers Grimm had gathered loses its conservative form. In reading Janosch the reader leaves the ceremonial fairy-tale seriousness of the Brothers Grimm. This does not mean that he has less than what the brothers have too much. As Jack Zipes summarizes, "Hans is transformed from a porcupine looking character into a hippy rock singer, who plays the harmonica. When his father gives him sunglasses and a motorcycle to get rid of him, he goes into the city and eventually becomes a movie star named Jack Eagle (Jack Adler). In the end the father is proud of him, and everyone from the village wants to look like him."
 It was adapted into a children's book in 2012. The book is titled Hans My Hedgehog and is written by Kate Coombs and illustrated by John Nickle.
 Andrzej Sapkowski's short story "A Question of Price" in The Last Wish collection is inspired by Hans My Hedgehog.

Television
 The story was featured as a cel animated short (Hungarian: Sündisznó) in the "Hungarian Folktales" episode of the 1989~1993 U.S.A. TV series Long Ago and Far Away.
 A version of it was also produced as an episode of Jim Henson's The Storyteller which stars Jason Carter as Hans' human form, Terence Harvey as the voice of Hans the Hedgehog, Abigail Cruttenden as the Princess, David Swift as the King, Helen Lindsay as the Queen, Eric Richard as the Farmer, and Maggie Wilkinson as the Farmer's Wife.

 The Hexer and The Witcher, adapted from Andrzej Sapkowski's The Witcher books, both include an adaptation of "A Question of Price", the short story based on Hans My Hedgehog.

Explanatory notes

References
Citations

Bibliography

Further reading

External links
 
 Hog Bridegroom: Tales of type 441 by D. L. Ashliman

Grimms' Fairy Tales
German fairy tales
Fictional hedgehogs
Fiction about magic
Fiction about shapeshifting
Child characters in literature
Male characters in literature
Male characters in fairy tales
Animal tales
Mythological human hybrids
ATU 400-459